Puerto Errado is a linear fresnel lens solar thermal power plant, located in the Region of Murcia of Spain. Puerto Errado 1 is 1.4 megawatts (MW), and was the first Fresnel-lens, solar power plant connected to the grid, in March 2009. Puerto Errado 2 added 30 MW in February, 2012. Power is being sold for 26.8717 Euro cents per kWh for the first 25 years and 21.5495 Euro cents/kWh thereafter.

Puerto Errado 2 covers a mirror surface of 302,000 m2 and is the world's largest Fresnel power plant in operation. The German company Novatec Solar has provided the Fresnel technology, and five Swiss utilities, EBL and IWB of Basel, EKZ and EWZ of Zurich, as well as EWB of Bern, are the owners of the plant.

See also 

List of solar thermal power stations
Renewable energy in the European Union
Solar power in Spain
Solar thermal energy
Wind power in Spain

References

Solar power stations in Spain
Energy in the Region of Murcia